Hafiz Naeem ur Rehman (born 1972) is a Pakistani politician and president of Jamaat-e-Islami, Karachi.

Early life and education 
Rehman was born in Hyderabad to Urdu-speaking Muhajir parents, who had migrated from Aligarh, India during Partition of India. Rehman got his Civil Engineering Degree from NED, and an Islamic History Masters Degree from Karachi University.

Political career
Rehman joined Islami Jamiat-e-Talaba (IJT) in early 90s.His first notable responsibility in (IJT), serve as president Islami Jamiat-e-Talaba (IJT) NEDUET in 1994. He served as president of IJT twice. In 2000 he became a member of JI. He also served as Assistant Secretary, General Secretary and Deputy Emir of Karachi. He became the ameer of Jamaat-e-Islami's Karachi chapter in 2013.

Actions against Karachi's Electric Utility 
Rehman has led many protests against Karachi's Electric Utility company, due to government's alleged favoritism to the utility company, and its alleged dis-service to the people of Karachi in terms of not returning its consumers their money under a claw-back clause applicable to the company. Rehman claimed the company's Rs 9 Billion profits in 2021, were at a cost of large subsidies received from the government, which costed tax payers money to benefit the owners of the utility company. 

Rehman also demanded a forensic audit of the Electric utility company, claiming that the utility company has been in close relations with all ruling political parties, and alleged that the company enjoyed benefits from the ruling parties.

Karachi Rights Campaign 
Rehman has led multiple protests in Karachi to fight for the rights of his city. He often cites Karachi being the largest tax payer city of Pakistan, and yet being ignored by central, provincial and local governments. Rehman pledged to address water supply and drainage issues of Karachi if his party is voted into power in 2022 local body elections.

Actions against Election Commission of Pakistan 
During the 2022 local body elections, Election Commission of Pakistan (ECP) delayed the agreed upon date of elections from 24 July 2022 to 28 August 2022 citing bad weather as the reason. ECP claimed that it delayed elections on the request of JI's local leadership, i.e. Rehman. Rehman challenged the ECP against this allegation and sent a legal notice to ECP, and threatened a sit-in against the ECP against this allegation. Later ECP issued a formal apology against the allegation. Rehman has repeatedly claimed ECP being an agent of the Pakistan People's Party in Sindh.

Call to expel Ambassador 
In 2022, Naeem-ur-Rehman demanded Indian Ambassador to Pakistan be expelled due to Indian ruling party's derogatory comments targeting the Prophet of Islam.

Election Victory 
Hafiz led JIP emerge as the largest political party in 2023 local bodies election. His party secured more than 50% of popular votes as well 83 UCs till 11th Feb. He also claimed that his party would win 13 more seats, if ECP decide on merit. ECP has hold the decision of 25 UCs on rigging elevations.

References

Jamaat-e-Islami Pakistan politicians
Living people
1970 births
People from Karachi
NED University of Engineering & Technology alumni